Harry Hardy  (November 5, 1875 – September 4, 1943), was a professional baseball player who played pitcher in the Major Leagues from 1905–1906. He would play for the Washington Senators.

External links

1875 births
1943 deaths
Washington Senators (1901–1960) players
Major League Baseball pitchers
Baseball players from Ohio
Decatur Commodores players
Providence Grays (minor league) players
Baltimore Orioles (IL) players
Binghamton Bingoes players
Scranton Miners players
Harrisburg Senators players
New Britain Perfectos players
Springfield Ponies players
Wheeling Stogies players